Pape Samba Ba (born March 1, 1982 in Saint-Louis) is a former Senegalese football midfielder.

Career

Club
He has previously played with Polish clubs Lech Poznań and Górnik Polkowice. He played also for some Azerbaijani teams.

In February 2011, he signed a one and a half year contract with KSZO Ostrowiec.

International
He was a part of the Senegalese national football team.

References

External links
 
 

1982 births
Living people
Senegalese footballers
Association football midfielders
Senegal international footballers
ASC Jeanne d'Arc players
Senegalese expatriate footballers
Expatriate footballers in Azerbaijan
FK Shamkir players
Senegalese expatriate sportspeople in Azerbaijan
FK Karvan players
Expatriate footballers in Poland
Lech Poznań players
Senegalese expatriate sportspeople in Poland
Górnik Polkowice players
Odra Opole players
Znicz Pruszków players
KSZO Ostrowiec Świętokrzyski players
MKP Pogoń Siedlce players
Sportspeople from Saint-Louis, Senegal